Tomobrachyta jenisi is a species of beetle in the family Cerambycidae. It was described by Adlbauer in 2001.

References

Dorcasominae
Beetles described in 2001